The Keil Isles were a New Zealand-based Rock & Roll group which consisted of the Keil Brothers, Olaf, Herman, Rudolf, Klaus and their cousin Freddie Keil. They were all Samoans with German ancestry.

Band history
Their lead guitarist Olaf Keil was born in Apia, Western Samoa in 1934 and came to New Zealand when he was about 18 years of age. He began playing guitar in a band that his uncle had. His cousin Fredde would ask him to back him on rock & roll songs.  Later on the other brothers became proficient and they formed the band in 1956. Freddie Keil left the band in the early 1960s after having a falling out with cousin Herma. He went on to form his own band. 

In 1966 the group appeared in the 1966 musical comedy film Don't Let It Get You. After becoming very popular, selling records and having hits, the band went through numerous personnel changes, and by 1967 there were no members of the Keil family left in the band.

During their popularity their version of The Twist sold more copies in New Zealand than the Chubby Checker version did.

Line Up
Olaf Keil (Lead Guitar)
Herma Keil (Rhythm Guitar)
Rudolph Keil (Bass Guitar)
Klaus Keil (Drums)
Freddie Keil (Vocals)
Eliza Keil (Vocals)
Helga Keil (Vocals)
Lou Miller (Bass) - Replaced Rudolf in 1959
Bill Fairs (Saxophone)
Heke Kewene (Piano)
Norman Akers (Piano) - Replaced Heke Kewene
Brian Henderson (Piano) - Replaced Norman Akers
Johnny Walker (Lead Guitar) - Replaced Klaus Keil
Warren McMillan (Bass) - Replaced Lou Miller
Puni Solomon (Bass) - Replaced Warren McMillan
George Barna (Saxophone) - Replaced Bill Fairs
Red Williamson (Drums) - Replaced Klaus Keil

Others
Brian Henderson (Piano)
Roger Skinner (Guitar)
Billy Kristian (Bass)
Jimmy Hill (Drums)

Occasional member
Alphonso Keil (Rhythm guitar)

Releases

45 Rpm
 Apache / Good Night Irene - Viking VS 50 
 In The Hall Of The Mountain King / Jalisco - Viking VP 173 - (1965)

EP

 Twistin' And A' Rockin''' - Viking VEEP 8 - (1964) 

LP
 Take Off With The Keil Isles - Viking VP 57 - (1961) (New Zealand)
 I Could Have Danced All Night - Viking VP 84 - (1962) (New Zealand)
 Herma And The Keil Isles - Viking VP 101 - (1963) (New Zealand)
 The Sound Of Herma & The Keil Isles - Viking VP.167 - (1965) (New Zealand)
 Keils A Go Go - Salem XP 5028 (New Zealand) (1966)
 Twenty Rock & Roll Hits - Regal SREG 30221 - (1980) (New Zealand)
 Rock From The Other Side Vol. 4'' - Down South Records DS.9214 - (1987) (Holland)

Compact Disc
 Keil Isles, The - Early Rock & Roll From New Zealand - Vol. 1 & 2 - Collector Records - CLCD 7753/A/B (Netherlands)

References

External links
AudioCulture profile
Mention in Billboard 24 Nov 1962
Music A Driving Force In Life Of Guitar Builder From Samoa

Samoan people of German descent
Viking Records artists
New Zealand rock music groups